Ohio's 16th senatorial district has always consisted of portions of the greater Columbus, Ohio area, and is now made up of the western portion of Franklin County.  It encompasses Ohio House districts 21, 23 and 24. It has a Cook PVI of R+6.  Its Ohio Senator is Republican Stephanie Kunze.  She resides in Hilliard, a city located in Franklin County.

List of senators

References

External links
Ohio's 16th district senator at the 130th Ohio General Assembly official website

Ohio State Senate districts